iPadOS 13 is the first major release of the iPadOS mobile operating system developed by Apple Inc. for their iPad line of tablet computers. The successor to iOS 12 on those devices, it was announced at the company's 2019 Worldwide Developers Conference (WWDC) on June 3, 2019, as a derivation from iOS, with a greater emphasis on multitasking and tablet-centric features. It was released on September 24, 2019. It was succeeded by iPadOS 14, released on September 16, 2020.

Overview 

The first iPad was released in 2010 and ran iPhone OS 3.2, which added support for the larger device to the operating system, previously only used on the iPhone and iPod Touch. This shared operating system was rebranded as "iOS" with the release of iOS 4.

The operating system initially had rough feature parity running on the iPhone, iPod Touch, and iPad, with variations in user interface depending on screen size, and minor differences in the selection of apps included. However, over time, the variant of iOS for the iPad incorporated a growing set of differentiating features, such as picture-in-picture, the ability to display multiple running apps simultaneously (both introduced with iOS 9 in 2015), drag and drop, and a dock that more closely resembled the one in macOS than the one on the iPhone (added in 2017 with iOS 11). Standard iPad apps were increasingly designed to support the optional use of a keyboard.

To emphasize the different feature set available on the iPad, and to signal their intention to develop the platforms in divergent directions, at WWDC 2019 Apple announced that the variant of iOS that runs on the iPad would be rebranded as "iPadOS." The new naming strategy began with iPadOS 13.1, in 2019.

Features

Home screen
Unlike previous versions of iOS, the icon grid displays up to five rows and six columns of apps (30), regardless of whether the device is in portrait or landscape orientation. The first page of the home screen can be configured to show a column of widgets from applications for easy access. Spotlight Search is no longer part of the widgets but can still be accessed by swiping down from the center of the home screen or pressing Command + Space on a connected keyboard.

Multitasking

iPadOS features a multitasking system developed with more capabilities compared to iOS, with features like Slide Over and Split View that make it possible to use multiple different applications simultaneously. Double-clicking the Home Button or swiping up from the bottom of the screen and pausing will display all currently active spaces. Each space can feature a single app, or a Split View featuring two apps. The user can also swipe left or right on the Home Indicator to go between spaces at any time, or swipe left/right with four fingers.

While using an app, swiping up slightly from the bottom edge of the screen will summon the Dock, where apps stored within can be dragged to different areas of the current space to be opened in either Split View or Slide Over. Dragging an app to the left or right edge of the screen will create a Split View, which will allow both apps to be used side by side. The size of the two apps in Split View can be adjusted by dragging a pill shaped icon in the center of the vertical divider and dragging the divider all the way to one side of the screen closes the respective app. If the user drags an app from the dock over the current app, it will create a floating window called Slide Over which can be dragged to either the left or right side of the screen. A Slide Over window can be hidden by swiping it off the right side of the screen, and swiping left from the right edge of the screen will restore it. Slide Over apps can also be cycled between by swiping left or right on the Home Indicator in the Slide Over window and pulling up on it will open an app switcher for Slide Over windows. A pill shaped icon at the top of apps in Split View or Slide Over allows them to be switched in an out of Split View and Slide Over.

The user can now have several instances of a single app open at once. A new mode similar to macOS's Mission Control has been added which allows the user to see all of the instances of an app.

In many applications, a notable exception being YouTube, videos can be shrunk down into a picture-in-picture window so the user can continue watching it while using other apps. This window containing the video can be resized by pinching and spreading and can be docked to any of the four corners of the screen. It can also be hidden by swiping it off the side of the screen and is denoted by an arrow at the edge where the video is hidden and swiping it will bring it back onscreen.

Safari
iPadOS Safari now shows desktop versions of websites by default, includes a download manager, and has 30 new keyboard shortcuts if an external keyboard is connected.

Sidecar
Sidecar allows for an iPad to function as a second monitor for macOS, named in reference to articulated motorcycles. When using Sidecar, the Apple Pencil can be used to emulate a graphics tablet for applications like Photoshop. This feature is supported only on iPads compatible with the Apple Pencil.

Storage
In addition to accessing local storage for general use, iPadOS allows external storage, such as USB flash drives, portable hard drives, and solid state drives to be connected to an iPad via the Files app. The iPad Pro (3rd generation) connects over USB-C, while the Lightning Camera Connection Kit can be used with previous iPads.

Mouse and trackpad support
Support for mice and trackpads was available since the first public release, albeit as an accessibility feature only. Complete support was added in version 13.4, which included multitouch gestures for trackpads, and allowed third-party apps to implement new features supporting mice and trackpads.

Supported devices
iPadOS 13 supports iPads with an Apple A8 or A8X chip or later, dropping support for devices with the A7 chip, more specifically the first-generation iPad Air and the iPad Mini 2 and iPad Mini 3. However, devices with an A8 chip have limited support. Devices supporting iPadOS 13 include:
iPad Air 2
iPad Air (3rd generation)
iPad (5th generation)
iPad (6th generation)
iPad (7th generation)
iPad Mini 4
iPad Mini (5th generation)
All iPad Pro models

An upgrade to iPadOS 13 is automatically offered to supported devices.

Version history 
The release of iPadOS 13 began with 13.1. 13.0 was never publicly released, though beta testing for iPadOS 13 started with 13.0.

References

External links
 – official site
 – official developer site
iOS Reference Library at the Apple Developer site

13
IPad
Apple Inc. operating systems
Mach (kernel)
Mobile operating systems
Products introduced in 2019
Tablet operating systems